Shopping malls in New Jersey have played a major role in shaping the suburban landscape of the state following World War II.

History

New Jersey, the most densely populated state in the United States, and in the suburban sphere of influence of both New York City and Philadelphia, Pennsylvania, has a comparatively large number of notable malls throughout the state. Paramus, in Bergen County, is one of the largest shopping meccas in the country, with its four major shopping malls accounting for a significant proportion of the over $5 billion in annual retail sales generated in the borough, more than any other ZIP Code in the United States. This high level of retail sales persists despite the fact that the County, in general, and the Borough, in particular, have blue laws that force the malls and other retailers to close on Sunday.

Garden State Plaza was the state's first shopping mall. It opened in three stages between May 1957 and September 1960 and was fully enclosed in 1984. The shopping complex is now known as Westfield Garden State Plaza. The Garden State's second mall-type shopping venue, Bergen Mall (now known as Outlets at Bergen Town Center), was built in Paramus and Maywood and was officially dedicated on November 14, 1957, with great fanfare, as Dave Garroway, host of The Today Show served as master of ceremonies.

The Bergen Mall, which was fully enclosed in 1973, was first planned in 1955 by Allied Stores to have 100 stores and 8,600 parking spaces in a  mall that would include a  Stern's store and two other  department stores as part of the initial design. Allied's chairman B. Earl Puckett confidently announced The Bergen Mall as the largest of ten proposed centers, stating that there were 25 cities that could support such centers and that no more than 50 malls of this type would ever be built nationwide.

Cherry Hill Mall, was the first large indoor shopping center on the East Coast of the United States and attracted busloads of visitors soon after its opening in October 1961. (The Southdale Shopping Center in Edina, Minnesota, was the very first enclosed mall, beating Cherry Hill to the honor by five years). The popularity of the mall as a destination is often cited as one of the factors that led the mall's host municipality to change its name from Delaware Township, to its current name of Cherry Hill Township.

Despite an early refusal to temporarily close other New Jersey shopping malls during the COVID-19 pandemic, New Jersey Governor Phil Murphy eventually agreed to do so on March 17, 2020. This came one day after the Jersey Gardens closed after an employee tested positive for COVID-19 and Jersey City Mayor Steve Fulop closed Jersey City's two major shopping malls Newport Centre and Hudson Mall.

Role as public square

With the shift in shopping from publicly owned Main Streets to privately held shopping malls, the question of access to malls, and their shoppers, as a public forum has been an issue raised nationwide. This issue has become particularly relevant in New Jersey, where malls in both suburban and exurban areas have largely supplanted local downtown districts as shopping destinations, depriving individuals and organizations of a public location to reach out to neighbors for distribution of fliers and other forms of expression. While different conclusions have been reached elsewhere, New Jersey's approach has been one of the most expansive in providing groups with access to malls as a public forum, despite their private ownership.

The Bergen Mall was the target of a lawsuit by nuclear-freeze advocates who challenged the malls restrictions on distribution of literature to shoppers. On October 12, 1984, Bergen County Superior Court judge Paul R. Huot ruled that the organization should be allowed to distribute literature anywhere and anytime in a shopping mall, noting that "The Bergen Mall has assumed the features and characteristics of the traditional town center for the citizens who reside in Paramus and surrounding Bergen County towns."

The New Jersey Supreme Court has been at the forefront in providing access to malls as a public forum under the New Jersey State Constitution's free-speech protections, requiring private owners of shopping malls to allow use as a forum by individuals and groups. In New Jersey Coalition Against War in the Middle East v. JMB Realty Corp. (1994), the Court ruled that because the mall owners "have intentionally transformed their property into a public square or market, a public gathering place, a downtown business district, a community," they cannot later deny their own implied invitation to use the space as it was clearly intended. Despite the broad powers granted to those seeking to use these facilities as public forums, mall owners retain the right to establish regulations regulating the time, place and manner of exercising of freedom of speech rights on their properties.

Role as performance venue
In their role as a public forum, malls have also developed a role as a public performance venue, as an addition to theaters, arenas and stadiums. Singer Tiffany was one of the pioneers in this innovative use of malls, using the mall tour as a stepping stone to stardom. The first performance on Tiffany's mall tour — "The Beautiful You: Celebrating The Good Life Shopping Mall Tour '87" — took place on June 23, 1987 at The Bergen Mall (now known as Outlets at Bergen Town Center) in Paramus. The tour was sponsored by major advertisers Toyota, Clairol, and Adidas. While perhaps not the first singer to do so, Tiffany established the shopping mall as a location for public performances. Britney Spears' Hair Zone Mall Tour built on Tiffany's use of the mall as a medium to reach fans. Currently, the New Jersey Youth Symphony plays annually in the Jersey Gardens Outlet Mall. This performance is known as the Playathon and occurs in March.

List of indoor malls

List of non traditional indoor malls

List of outlet malls

List outdoor malls

Largest malls

The largest malls in New Jersey—those with at least  of Gross Leasable Area (GLA) and ranked in descending order by size—are:
 American Dream Meadowlands – 
 Westfield Garden State Plaza – 
 Freehold Raceway Mall – 
 Woodbridge Center – 
 Willowbrook Mall – 
 Monmouth Mall – 
 The Mall At Short Hills – 
 The Mills at Jersey Gardens – 
 Rockaway Townsquare – 
 Cherry Hill Mall – 
 Menlo Park Mall – 
 Newport Centre – 
 Quaker Bridge Mall – 
 Deptford Mall – 
 Moorestown Mall – 
 Hamilton Mall – 
 The Outlets at Bergen Town Center – 
 Bridgewater Commons –

Former shopping malls
The following shopping malls have been demolished or closed. Some have been replaced by new strip plazas or re-developed for non-retail uses:

References

 
Shopping malls
Dynamic lists
New Jersey